Zeel Desai (born 18 February 1999) is an Indian tennis player.

Desai has a career-high singles ranking of 549 by the WTA, achieved on 19 September 2022. She also has a career-high WTA doubles ranking of 510, attained on 10 September 2018. Desai has won two singles titles and four doubles titles on the ITF Circuit.

Desai represents India at the Billie Jean King Cup and made her debut at the 2021 play-offs against Latvia.

ITF Circuit finals

Singles: 8 (2 titles, 6 runner–ups)

Doubles: 11 (5 titles, 6 runner–ups)

References

External links
 
 
 
 

1999 births
Living people
Indian female tennis players
Sportspeople from Ahmedabad